Gin and Orange is a 1969 album by organist Brother Jack McDuff recorded both live and in the studio which was his third release on the Cadet label.

Reception
Rovi in his review for Allmusic states, "GIN features a slightly higher quotient of electric guitar than usual and--something unique for most jazz organ sessions--the super-funky electric bass of Phil Upchurch. With BBQ-rich arrangements by Richard Evans, the result is a heavier sound that McDuff none-the-less cuts through like crazy".

Track listing 
All compositions by Jack McDuff except as indicated
 "Mac-Duffin" (Richard Evans, Jack McDuff) - 3:03  
 "The Electric Surfboard" - 5:02  
 "On the Case" (Evans) - 2:59  
 "Channel One" - 5:56  
 "Get It Up" (Evans) - 3:02  
 "Gin and Orange" - 4:19  
 "Beep-Bo-Boo" - 7:22  
 "With the Wind" (Clara Edwards, Jack Lawrence) - 6:46  
Recorded at Ter Mar Studios (tracks 1, 3 & 5) and The London House (tracks 2, 4 & 6-8), Chicago, Illinois in April 1969

Personnel 
 Brother Jack McDuff - organ
 Gene Barge - alto saxophone (tracks 1, 3 & 5)
 Ben Branch (tracks 1, 3 & 5), Cliff Davis (tracks 2, 4 & 6-8), Billy Phipps (tracks 2, 4 & 6-8) - tenor saxophone
 Cash McCall (tracks 1, 3 & 5), Jerry Byrd (tracks 2, 4 & 6-8) - guitar 
 Phil Upchurch - electric bass (tracks 1, 3 & 5)
 Morris Jennings (tracks 1, 3 & 5), Joe Burkes (tracks 2, 4 & 6-8) - drums
 Richard Powell - percussion (tracks 1, 3 & 5)

References 

 
Jack McDuff live albums
1969 live albums
Cadet Records live albums